Duncan John Robertson (born 6 February 1947) is a former New Zealand rugby union player. He represented Otago at a provincial level, making 104 appearances and playing most of his games at second five-eighth. Robertson was a member of the New Zealand national side, the All Blacks, from 1973 to 1977, playing mostly as a first five-eighth, but also as a fullback towards the end of his career. He played 30 matches for the All Blacks including 10 internationals.

References

1947 births
Living people
Rugby union players from Dunedin
People educated at King Edward Technical College
New Zealand rugby union players
New Zealand international rugby union players
Otago rugby union players
Rugby union fly-halves
Rugby union centres
Rugby union fullbacks